Rhopobota myrtillana is a moth of the family Tortricidae. It is found on the British Isles, from northern and central Europe to Asia Minor and Siberia.

The wingspan is 19–21 mm. The forewings are brown with two light grey-brown cross-bands. At the costal edge out towards the wing tip there are 4-5 small white spots. The hindwings are brown. 

Adults are on wing in May and June.

The larvae feed on Vaccinium, Ledum palustre, Berberis vulgaris, Cornus sanguinea and Quercus. Larvae found feeding on Vaccinium myrtillus, Vaccinium vitis-idaea and Vaccinium uliginosum live between two leaves spun flatly one above the other, usually on the upper part of the plant.

References

External links
Eurasian Tortricidae

Moths described in 1845
Eucosmini
Moths of Europe
Insects of Turkey